Cerna (Heartwood in English) is a Galician political party. Cerna was founded in 2014 and has an ideology based in Galician nationalism, direct democracy, anticapitalism, feminism and alter-globalization. Cerna was created to organize the critical sector of Anova-Nationalist Brotherhood that focuses on highlighting the nationalist and assembly-based character of the party.

History
At the 2014 National Assembly of Anova, CERNA was allocated only 3 seats in the party's National Council. The 3 elected representatives resigned, and CERNA conducted an internal referendum to decide if they should leave Anova-Nationalist Brotherhood and form a separate party. Finally, the organization decided to leave ANOVA, with 75% of its members supporting the split. The turnout comprised 73% of the organization's activists (201 of 276).

References

External links
 Cerna official website 

2014 establishments in Galicia (Spain)
Alter-globalization
Galician nationalism
Political parties established in 2014
Socialist parties in Galicia (Spain)
Secessionist organizations in Europe